June 2016

References 

 06
June 2016 events in the United States